Lost Loves is an album from Minus the Bear. The album contains rare and unreleased songs from the band's history. It was released on October 7, 2014 through Dangerbird Records.

Track listing

Personnel
 Jake Snider – Vocals, Guitar
 Dave Knudson – Guitar
 Erin Tate – Drums, Percussion
 Cory Murchy – Bass
 Alex Rose – Keyboards, Vocals

References

External links

2014 albums
Minus the Bear albums
Dangerbird Records albums